The Type 720 Helgoland-class tugs are large seagoing salvage tugs used by the German Navy. After the decommissioning of Helgoland, the class is now referred to as the Fehmarn class in the German Navy. As with other auxiliary ship classes in Germany, these tugboats are crewed by civilians. The ships are named after the German islands Helgoland (Heligoland) and Fehmarn.

List of ships

References

 

Auxiliary ships of Germany
Tugboats of Germany
Auxiliary tugboat classes
Auxiliary ships of the German Navy
Ships of Uruguay